The 2007–08 Serie B regular season is the seventy-sixth since its establishment. It started on August 25, 2007, and ended with the promotion playoff final on June 15, 2008.

At the end of the year, three teams were promoted to Serie A, the first two via direct promotion (league champions, Chievo Verona, and Bologna), and the third team after two rounds of playoffs (Lecce).

Four teams were relegated to Serie C1. The bottom three were relegated directly (Cesena, Spezia and Ravenna), as was the fourth-to-last team (Avellino), since they finished 9 points back of the fifth-to-last, Treviso, denying them a chance at a survival "relegation-playoff".

The 2007–08 Serie B season marked the first appearance in the division for newly promoted Grosseto. Ravenna and Chievo returned to the second-highest Italian division after six years, their last time in Serie B having been in 2001 (both, in fact, returned to the leagues from which they'd come after this season). Pisa returned to Serie B after 13 years, surprisingly qualifying for the promotion playoffs.

Teams

Stadiums and locations 
The following 22 clubs comprise the Serie B in 2007-08:

Personnel and kits

Events 
In November, it was announced that Serie B matches, as well as Serie C matches, would be postponed for one week after increasing violence surrounding Italian football matches, in which football fans attacked police, stemming from the shooting of a Lazio fan by a policeman. Serie A matches were unaffected as none were scheduled for that weekend due to an international match between Italy and Scotland.

On January 19, at the conclusion of the andata (first half of the league season), Chievo Verona and Bologna were named winter co-champions.

Promotions

With a 1–1 draw away to Grosseto on Matchday 41, Chievo Verona mathematically assured themselves of promotion to Serie A.

On the final matchday, Bologna's 1–0 victory over Pisa rendered Lecce's victory by the same score immaterial; Bologna secured the second direct promotion.  Chievo Verona's 2–2 draw with Bari outdistanced the rossoblu, however, giving the mussi volanti their first league title in 14 years.

Lecce were instead left to contest the two-round promotion playoff with AlbinoLeffe, Brescia and Pisa, which will determine the identity of the 20th and final team in Italy's top flight.

Relegations

On Day 40, Cesena became the first team mathematically relegated to Serie C1 with its 2–1 loss at Treviso.  Although Cesena could still have finished 19th at the time, at best it would have been 5 points behind 18th-placed Treviso, a condition that would have made playouts unnecessary.

Then on Day 41, another Treviso win—coupled with concurrent losses by Ravenna, Avellino, and Spezia—ensured that none of those three teams would finish within 4 points of the veneti, consigning all three of them to Serie C1.

Final classification

Results

Promotion play-off
Semifinals
First legs played June 4, 2008; return legs played June 8, 2008

Finals
First leg played June 11, 2008; return leg played June 15, 2008

Lecce promoted to Serie A

Top goalscorers
Players with at least 10 goals

 28 goals
  Denis Godeas (Mantova)
 24 goals
  Pablo Granoche (Triestina)
 23 goals
  Marco Cellini (AlbinoLeffe)
  Massimo Marazzina (Bologna)
 22 goals
  Sergio Pellissier (Chievo Verona)
 21 goals
  José Ignacio Castillo (Pisa)
 20 goals
  Francesco Lodi (Frosinone)
 18 goals
  Salvatore Bruno (Modena)  Alessandro Pellicori (Avellino)  Andrea Soncin (Ascoli) 17 goals
  Simone Tiribocchi (Lecce) 16 goals
  Marco Bernacci (Ascoli)  Davide Possanzini (Brescia)  Davide Succi (Ravenna) 15 goals
  Davide Moscardelli (Cesena) 14 goals
  Barreto (Treviso)  Zlatko Dedič (Piacenza) 13 goals
  Felice Evacuo (Frosinone)  Massimiliano Guidetti (Spezia) 12 goals
  Elvis Abbruscato (Lecce)  Luigi Beghetto (Treviso)  Jeda (Rimini)  Daniele Vantaggiato (Rimini) 11 goals
  Adrián Ricchiuti (Rimini)  Francesco Ruopolo (AlbinoLeffe)  Ferdinando Sforzini (Ravenna) 10 goals
  Raffaele Biancolino (Messina)  Alessio Cerci (Pisa)  Vitali Kutuzov (Pisa)  Davide Lanzafame (Bari)  Mario Salgado (Avellino)Managers

2007-08 events
 AlbinoLeffe: on June 18, the club announced separation from head coach Emiliano Mondonico. The next day the club officially unveiled Elio Gustinetti, former club boss in the early Serie B campaigns for the club, as new boss. Under his reign, AlbinoLeffe managed to reach the top position of the league, becoming a potential candidate for a historical direct promotion to Serie A; however, four home consecutive losses in the end of the regular season deprived the seriani of this chance, just leaving them the opportunity to play the promotion playoffs. A 0–4 home loss to Rimini and a strained relationship between Gustinetti and club chairman Andreoletti led the latter to sack him on May 26, 2008 and appoint youth team coach Armando Madonna at the helm of the team for the remaining final league match and the following promotion playoffs.
 Avellino: on July 16, Giovanni Vavassori, originally confirmed at the helm of the club following their victory in the Serie C1 promotion playoffs, tended his resignations. Two days later the club announced to have appointed Maurizio Sarri as new head coach. But on August 23, only two days before the first Serie B matchday, Sarri resigned too, with Guido Carboni replacing him the same day. On March 10, 2008, with Avellino in 20th place, Carboni was sacked by the club management and replaced by Alessandro Calori.
 Ascoli: on June 15, former Frosinone boss Ivo Iaconi was unveiled as new head coach, succeeding Nedo Sonetti.
 Bari: on December 28, 2007 Giuseppe Materazzi tended his resignations following a clear loss to Lecce in a local derby, and only one day after having been confirmed at the helm of the galletti by the club management. He was replaced the same day by Antonio Conte.
 Bologna: on June 11 Daniele Arrigoni was announced as new head coach.
 Cesena: on November 11 Fabrizio Castori was sacked by Cesena following a 4–1 defeat at Rimini in the local derby which left the club down to last place, with Giovanni Vavassori being appointed to replace him the next day. However, on February 25, 2008, following a string of poor results which left Cesena in second-last place, Vavassori was sacked himself, with Castori being recalled at the helm of the bianconeri.
 Chievo Verona: the position, left vacant following separation between the club and head coach Luigi Delneri, was filled on June 15 by Giuseppe Iachini.
 Frosinone: on June 22 Alberto Cavasin was announced as new boss, thus filling the position left vacant following separation between the club and head coach Ivo Iaconi.
 Grosseto: the newly promoted side separated from head coach Antonello Cuccureddu on June 6 and replaced him with Giorgio Roselli two days later. On September 10, following three disappointing losses in the first three league days, Roselli was sacked. Consequently, on the following day the management announced the appointment of Stefano Pioli as new boss.
 Mantova: on June 11, 2007 Attilio Tesser was announced as new head coach, replacing Domenico Di Carlo, who chose not to renew his contract with the virgiliani. Mantova started their season as a strong candidate for immediate promotion to Serie A, but they struggled to do so and Tesser was consequently sacked on February 24, 2008 after a 1–1 home tie with relegation-battling Bari which left the biancorossi seven points behind the last promotion playoff spot. The next day, Giuseppe Brucato was named new head coach for the remainder of the season.
 Messina: on June 18, 2007 Nello Di Costanzo of Venezia was announced as new boss.
 Modena: on April 20, 2008 the Modena club management decided to sack Bortolo Mutti from the team's head coaching post, re-appointing former boss Daniele Zoratto back at the helm of the gialloblu.
 Piacenza: the position, left vacant following Giuseppe Iachini's departure to Chievo, was filled on July 2, 2007 with the appointment of former Sassuolo boss Gian Marco Remondina. As Remondina does not have a valid coaching licence valid for the Serie B league (known as Patentino di Prima Categoria, "first category licence"), he will officially appear as assistant coach beside former youth team coach Felice Secondini. On October 23 Remondina was however sacked due to poor results and replaced with former Empoli and Brescia boss Mario Somma.
 Pisa: on June 19, only two days after being promoted to Serie B through playoffs, the club announced separation from head coach Piero Braglia. On June 25, the club announced Giampiero Ventura's appointment for the 2007–08 season.
 Ravenna: on December 2, the newly promoted Serie B side announced to have dismissed Dino Pagliari from his head coaching position, as he struggled to keep the team off the relegation zone, appointing Franco Varrella as his replacement the next day. On January 14, 2008, as Ravenna failed to improve their results, Varrella was axed himself and Pagliari was called back at the helm of the giallorossi''. Pagliari lasted only three months, being ultimately sacked once again on April 7, 2008 with Ravenna lying in last place with eight matches remaining. The same day Ravenna choice to reinstate Varrella at the head coaching position.
 Treviso: on June 16 Giuseppe Pillon was officially unveiled as new head coach.
 Triestina: on June 13 the club management announced to have appointed Rolando Maran as new head coach for the 2007–08 season, thus replacing former boss Franco Varrella.

References 

Serie B seasons
2007–08 in Italian football leagues
Italy